Robinson Karibien, was the eleventh season of Expedition Robinson (or Survivor) to air in Sweden, with its premiere on 21 November 2009 on the Swedish television channel TV4. The host for this season were revealed on 25 June 2009 to be Paolo Roberto.
In the end, Hans Brettschneider defeated Jimmy Führ with a vote of 5–3.

Season summary
Robinson Karibien took place at the Samaná peninsula in the Dominican Republic and therefore were several elements that alluded to Caribbean phenomenon, especially voodoo. The tribe names was inspired from the loa spirits of the Voodoo religion practiced in Haiti - Agwé, Brise, Gede and Papa Legba. Also in several of the Reward and Immunity Challenges, various symbols associated with voodoo were used, including needles in voodoo dolls during the Tribal Councils - "voodoo curses".

The eighteen contestants were initially divided into two tribes, one for the men (Agwe) and one for the women (Brise). During episode 2, the tribes were mixed so each team consisted of four men and four women. Three contestants (Susanne, Angelica and Ewa) left the competition due to hunger, illness and personal reasons. Five contestants (Jonny, Tienne, Simon, Liliana and Sofia) were voted off in Tribal Councils.

When it was time for the merge into the Legba tribe, Agwe consisted of Anders, Mats and Jimmy and Brise consisted of Fredrik, Hans, Johan, Mikko, Suzanna and Veronica, while the voted out person Annika went to the new and secret tribe Ghede, where the voted off went to. When it was only four contestants in Legba, they competed against Ghede in a Reward Challenge, where Ghede were victorious. The contestants in Ghede were told they would have a challenge between them, where the winner would come back into Legba. Hans took the final place and went on competing against Jimmy, Suzanna and Anders. Hans and Jimmy went to the finals, there the other contestants voted on which of the two who would win Robinson Karibien. Hans won with five votes against Jimmy's three.

Contestants

The Total Votes is the number of votes a castaway has received during Tribal Councils where the castaway is eligible to be voted out of the game. It does not include the votes received during the final Tribal Council.

 Because Mats had immunity, one vote against him did not count.
 Eliminated contestants went to the Ghede tribe (but still had a chance to win Robinson Karibien).

Results overview

In the case of multiple tribes or castaways who win reward or immunity, they are listed in order of finish, or alphabetically where it was a team effort; where one castaway won and invited others, the invitees are in brackets.

 The Ghede tribe competed for a place back in the Legba tribe.
 These were competitions to decide who would get a place in the finals. The first one was won by Jimmy, so Anders, Hans and Suzanna competed in the second one.

Voting history

 In previous Tribal Councils, the person voted off had to put one needle in one of the voodoo dolls that represented each of his/her former tribe members. This later became votes in the eighth Tribal Council.
 Because Mats had immunity, the vote (from Sofia) against him did not count.
 Because Liliana already was voted off, the vote (from Simon) against her did not count.
 After the Tribal Council ended in a tie, the remaining contestants (Anders and Suzanna) had to discuss about which one they would vote off. They decided to vote off Veronica.

External links
http://www.tv4.se/robinson

 2009b
Swedish reality television series
2009 Swedish television seasons
2010 Swedish television seasons